Tell Shamsine is an archaeological site 1.75km north northeast of Ain Anjar in the Beqaa Mohafazat (Governorate) in Lebanon. It dates at least to the Neolithic.

References

Baalbek District
Neolithic settlements
Archaeological sites in Lebanon
Great Rift Valley